Wenecja Castle is a castle located in Wenecja, Kuyavian-Pomeranian Voivodeship in Poland. It dates back to the 14th century.

References 

Castles in Kuyavian-Pomeranian Voivodeship